Tess Trueheart is the love interest character in the American comic strip Dick Tracy, which was created by Chester Gould in 1931.

The character eventually became the wife of Dick Tracy in the original comic strip.

In the 1934-1948 radio series Dick Tracy, she was voiced by Helen Lewis.

The character of Tess Trueheart has been featured in films, including 1945's Dick Tracy and its sequel Dick Tracy vs. Cueball, portrayed in both by actress Anne Jeffreys, and in 1990's Dick Tracy, which starred Glenne Headly as Tess.

References

External links
 Tess Trueheart on IMDb

Dick Tracy characters
Comics characters introduced in 1931
Fictional American people
Female characters in comics
Adventure film characters
Film serial characters